The 2018 Adrian Flux British FIM Speedway Grand Prix was the fifth race of the 2018 Speedway Grand Prix season. It took place on 21 July at the Principality Stadium in Cardiff, Wales.

Riders 
The Speedway Grand Prix Commission nominated Robert Lambert as the wild card, and Daniel Bewley and Jason Garrity both as Track Reserves.

Results 
The Grand Prix was won by Bartosz Zmarzlik, who beat Tai Woffinden, Maciej Janowski and Greg Hancock in the final. As a result of finishing second, Woffinden extended his overall lead in the championship to 20 points. Fredrik Lindgren, who failed to make the semi-finals, remained in second place, just two points ahead of Janowski in third.

Heat details

Intermediate classification

References

See also 
 Motorcycle speedway

Great Britain
Speedway Grand Prix
Sports competitions in Cardiff
Speedway Grand Prix of Great Britain
Speedway Grand Prix of Great Britain